
Gmina Kluczbork is an urban-rural gmina (administrative district) in Kluczbork County, Opole Voivodeship, in south-western Poland.

The gmina contains part of the protected area called Stobrawa Landscape Park.

Villages
Apart from the town of Kluczbork, Gmina Kluczbork contains the villages and settlements of Bąków, Bażany, Biadacz, Bogacica, Bogacka Szklarnia, Bogdańczowice, Borkowice, Czaple Wolne, Gotartów, Krasków, Krzywizna, Kujakowice Dolne, Kujakowice Górne, Kuniów, Ligota Dolna, Ligota Górna, Ligota Zamecka, Łowkowice, Maciejów, Nowa Bogacica, Przybkowice, Smardy Dolne, Smardy Górne, Stare Czaple, Unieszów and Żabiniec.

Neighbouring gminas
Gmina Kluczbork is bordered by the gminas of Byczyna, Gorzów Śląski, Lasowice Wielkie, Murów, Olesno and Wołczyn.

Twin towns – sister cities

Gmina Kluczbork is twinned with:
 Bad Dürkheim, Germany
 Berezhany, Ukraine
 Dzierżoniów, Poland

References

Kluczbork
Kluczbork County

de:Kluczbork#Gemeinde